Alan Keith Walker (4 October 1925 – 19 June 2005) was an Australian sportsman. He played rugby union for his country, winning five caps, and scored 19 tries on the tour to Britain and France in 1947–48, including a memorable effort against England at Twickenham stadium. He also played two home Tests against the British and Irish Lions in 1950 before deciding to concentrate his attentions on cricket, which he played as a left-arm fast-medium bowler. In the 1952 NSWRFL season he played first-grade rugby league for Manly-Warringah and Leigh RLFC (Heritage No. 632).

As a cricketer, Walker made his first-class debut for New South Wales at The Gabba in 1948/49 and played for the state until the 1952/53 season. He was selected for the 1949/50 tour of South Africa led by Lindsay Hassett, but was behind the likes of Keith Miller and Ray Lindwall in the pecking order and never played Test cricket. He later played county cricket in England for Nottinghamshire, taking 55 wickets in the 1956 season.

He performed the unusual feat of taking four wickets in four balls for Nottinghamshire against Leicestershire at Leicester in 1956. Uniquely, he took the last wicket of Leicestershire's first innings (Jack Firth), and then the first three wickets of the second innings with his first three balls (Gerry Lester, Maurice Tompkin and Gerald Smithson).

Walker died at the age of 79 in June 2005.

References

External links

1925 births
2005 deaths
Australia international rugby union players
Australian cricketers
Australian rugby union players
Commonwealth XI cricketers
Leigh Leopards players
Manly Warringah Sea Eagles players
New South Wales cricketers
Nottinghamshire cricketers
People educated at Sydney Grammar School
Rugby union players from Sydney
Rugby union centres
Rugby league players from Sydney
Cricketers from Sydney
Australian expatriate sportspeople in England